Dimitrios Eleftheropoulos (Greek: Δημήτριος Ελευθερόπουλος; born 7 August 1976) is a Greek professional football manager and former player, who is the current manager of Super League 2 club Niki Volos.

Club career

Greece
Eleftheropoulos was born in Piraeus, and was an ardent supporter of major Greek club Olympiacos, where he started playing as a goalkeeper at a very young age. Except for 1996, when he was loaned to Proodeftiki, he played for Olympiakos from 1994 to 2004, winning seven championships in a row.

He was the young third goalkeeper in 1997's Olympiacos roster behind Foto Strakosha and Alekos Rantos but injuries and bad games from the previous two made coach Dusan Bajevic give him a chance. His astonishing performances, which included impossible saves and penalty stops eventually lifted Eleftheropoulos to the level of an idol earning the nickname of "The Eagle", being one of the masterpieces for Olympiakos championship after ten years of disappointments.

He lost nearly all the 1998 season due to a severe knee injury, which was worsened by a badly treated arthrosis that also affected his shoulder. This did not prevent a glorious comeback in the 1999 UEFA Champions League, with Olympiacos advancing to the quarterfinals for the first time and being chosen as the best goalkeeper in the competition.

On 23 October 2001, Eleftheropoulos made a sensational penalty save to Ruud van Nistelrooy in the 65th minute between Manchester United and Olympiacos for Champions League, in Old Trafford. It was the only penalty missed by the Dutch international striker for that season.

He is also remembered by some for being the goalkeeper present during the worst loss of any Greek team in the Champions League, when on 10 December 2003 Olympiakos lost to Juventus 7–0.

Italy
In 2004, Eleftheropoulos transferred to newly promoted Serie A side Messina, where, despite some great performances, he could not unseat Marco Storari in the starting eleven.

In 2005, he was signed by Milan. Even though, due to a series of subpar performances in friendlies against Chelsea and Chicago Fire during a summer tour in the United States, coupled with Milan's heavy surplus of goalkeepers, he was sold to Roma where he remained game-less for the entire season.

Eleftheropoulos signed for Ascoli for the '06–07 Championship and on 25 February 2007 he played his first Serie A match for Ascoli against Livorno.

On 11 June 2007, he was signed by A.C. Siena on free transfer, for a 2-year deal, where although beginning the season in the starting eleven, he finished as the substitute goalkeeper behind Austrian international Alex Manninger. According to Siena's official website, on 28 May 2009, Eleftheropoulos decided to leave the club for family reasons.

Return to Greece
On 30 May 2009, Eleftheropoulos signed with PAS Giannina, a team locally known as "Ajax of Epirus" which in the past had formed players like Giourkas Seitaridis, that has promoted to the First Division. He started his new season becoming the most experienced player for his new club. Great saves during matches against Kavala, his former team Olympiacos and AEK Athens contributed to achieve victory for PAS Giannina and himself to be elected as Man of the Match. 
Eleftheropoulos after 5 years reached again the semi-final of the Greek Cup with his new club against Panathinaikos.
On 3 August 2010, Eleftheropoulos signed a contract with Iraklis
In the summer 2011, signed with Panionios. He announced the end of his career on 21 December 2011.

International career
Eleftheropoulos got his first of twelve senior international caps for Greece in a friendly against Belgium in 1999. From these caps, three were in the 2002 FIFA World Cup qualification rounds for the European zone; where although having brilliant performances in both games against Germany, he was left aside from the national team after a strong cross with coach Vassilis Daniil. For the Euro 2004, coach Otto Rehhagel chose Antonis Nikopolidis as his starting keeper and Konstantinos Chalkias and Fanis Katergiannakis as substitutes, leaving Eleftheropoulos out of the roster.

Style of play
In his prime, Eleftheropoulos was an agile and athletic goalkeeper with quick reflexes and tremendous shot-stopping skills, both in short and long-range shots. Furthermore, he was known for his brave and risky style, which he used effectively while rushing off his line in one on one situations. What is more, he was a skilled penalty-stopper, making crucial saves, especially in European matches (notably, against Ruud van Nistelrooy in an Old Trafford match in 2001). Despite being effective while playing in the goal, though, he faced several problems while handling crosses and his performances were negatively affected from time to time due to serious injuries.

Managerial career
Eleftheropoulos started his managerial career at Panionios. He most recently managed Super League side Asteras Tripolis, as he was appointed to replace Makis Chavos on 27 September 2016. For the third consecutive time he teamed up with his former club teammate Stylianos Venetidis who served as assistant manager. His contract was terminated on 17 February 2017 by mutual consent, on grounds of successive poor results culminating to a 0-5 heavy home defeat against Panathinaikos.

Managerial statistics

Honours

Club 
Olympiacos
 Greek Superleague: 1996–97, 1997–98, 1998–99, 1999–2000, 2000–01, 2001–02, 2002–03
 Greek Cup: 1998-1999 | Runner-up 2000-2001, 2001-2002

International 
Greece U21
 UEFA Euro U21: Runner-up 1998

References
Notes

Bibliography
Dimitrios Eleftheropoulos signed for Pas Giannina F.C.
Dimitrios Eleftheropoulos signed for Pas Giannina F.C.
Dimitrios Eleftheropoulos decided to leave A.C. Siena
Dimitrios Eleftheropoulos leave A.C. Siena

External links

1976 births
Living people
Footballers from Piraeus
Greece international footballers
Greece under-21 international footballers
Olympiacos F.C. players
A.C.R. Messina players
A.C. Milan players
A.S. Roma players
Ascoli Calcio 1898 F.C. players
A.C.N. Siena 1904 players
Serie A players
Expatriate footballers in Italy
Association football goalkeepers
Proodeftiki F.C. players
PAS Giannina F.C. players
Iraklis Thessaloniki F.C. players
Greek expatriate footballers
Greek expatriate sportspeople in Italy
Super League Greece players
Greek football managers
Greek expatriate football managers
Panionios F.C. managers
AEK Larnaca FC managers
Olympiacos Volos F.C. managers
Veria F.C. managers
Panserraikos F.C. managers
Super League Greece managers
Expatriate football managers in Cyprus
Greek footballers